

Events and publications

January
 Ace Comics (1937 series) #22 - David McKay Publications
 Action Comics (1938 series) #8 - National Allied Publications
 Adventure Comics (1938 series) #34 - National Allied Publications
 Amazing Mystery Funnies (1938 series) #5 - Centaur Publications
 Detective Comics (1937 series) #23 - National Allied Publications
 Feature Funnies (1937 series) #16 - Comic Favorites, Inc.
 More Fun Comics (1936 series) #39 - National Periodical Publications

February
 Ace Comics #23 - David McKay Publications
 Action Comics #9 - National Allied Publications
 Adventure Comics #35 - National Allied Publications
 Amazing Mystery Funnies #6 - Centaur Publications
 Detective Comics #24 - National Allied Publications
 Feature Funnies #17 - Comic Favorites, Inc.
 More Fun Comics #40 - National Periodical Publications

March
 Ace Comics #24 - David McKay Publications
 Action Comics #10 - National Allied Publications
 Adventure Comics #36 - National Allied Publications
 Amazing Mystery Funnies #7 - Centaur Publications
 Detective Comics #25 - National Allied Publications
 Feature Funnies #18 - Comic Favorites, Inc.
 More Fun Comics #41 - National Periodical Publications

April
 6-7 April: Fox Publications is sued by DC Comics over their comics character Wonder Man who plagiarizes their Superman. Fox loses their case and is forced to discontinue the comic strip.   
 Ace Comics #25 - David McKay Publications
 Action Comics #11 - National Allied Publications
 Adventure Comics #37 - National Allied Publications
 All-American Comics #1 - All-American Publications
 Amazing Mystery Funnies #8 - Centaur Publications
 Detective Comics #26 - National Allied Publications
 Feature Funnies #19 - Comic Favorites, Inc.
 More Fun Comics #42 - National Periodical Publications
 Movie Comics (1939 series) #1 - National Periodical Publications

May
 May 20: In Floyd Gottfredson's Mickey Mouse comic strip the villain Phantom Blot and the policeman Chief O'Hara make their debut; in the story Outwits the Phantom Blot.
Ace Comics #26 - David McKay Publications
 Action Comics #12 - National Allied Publications
 Adventure Comics #38 - National Allied Publications
 All-American Comics #2 - All-American Publications
 Amazing Mystery Funnies #9 - Centaur Publications
 Detective Comics #27 - National Allied Publications - First appearance of Batman
 Feature Funnies #20 - Comic Favorites, Inc.
 More Fun Comics #43 - National Periodical Publications
 Movie Comics #2 - National Periodical Publications

June
 Ace Comics #27 - David McKay Publications
 Action Comics #13 - National Allied Publications
 Adventure Comics #39 - National Allied Publications
 All-American Comics #3 - National Allied Publications
 Amazing Mystery Funnies #10 - Centaur Publications
 Detective Comics #28 - National Allied Publications
 Feature Comics (previously Feature Funnies) #21 - Quality Comics
 More Fun Comics #44 - National Periodical Publications
 Movie Comics #3 - National Periodical Publications
 Superman (1939 series) #1, cover dated Summer - National Periodical Publications

July
 Ace Comics #28 - David McKay Publications
 Action Comics #14 - National Allied Publications
 Adventure Comics #40 - National Allied Publications. In this issue Gardner Fox, Bert Christman, Ogden Whitney and Creig Flessel's The Sandman makes his debut.
 All-American Comics #4 - All-American Publications
 Amazing Mystery Funnies #11 - Centaur Publications
 Detective Comics #29 - National Allied Publications. In this issue Gardner Fox introduces Batman's utility belt in Batman by Bill Finger and Bob Kane.
 Feature Comics #22 - Quality Comics
 More Fun Comics #45 - National Periodical Publications
 Movie Comics #4 - National Periodical Publications
 The Magic Comic #1 - D. C. Thomson & Co.
 In Wonderworld Comics #3 Will Eisner and Jerry Iger's The Flame makes his debut.

August
 Ace Comics #29 - David McKay Publications
 Action Comics #15 - National Allied Publications
 Adventure Comics #41 - National Allied Publications
 All-American Comics #5 - All-American Publications
 Amazing Mystery Funnies #12 - Centaur Publications
 Detective Comics #30 - National Allied Publications
 Feature Comics #23 - Quality Comics
 More Fun Comics #46 - National Periodical Publications
 Movie Comics #5 - National Periodical Publications
 Mystery Men Comics #1 (1939 series) - Fox Feature Syndicate - First appearance of Blue Beetle
 Smash Comics #1 (1939 series) - Quality Comics

September
  Newspaper strip Ben Bowyang by Alex Gurney begins publication
 Ace Comics #30 - David McKay Publications
 Action Comics #16 - National Allied Publications
 Adventure Comics #42 - National Allied Publications
 All-American Comics #6 - All-American Publications
 Amazing Man Comics (1939 series) #5 - Centaur Publications
 Amazing Mystery Funnies #13 - Centaur Publications
 Detective Comics #31 - National Allied Publications. In this issue Gardner Fox introduces the Batarang in Batman by Bob Kane and Bill Finger.
 Feature Comics #24 - Quality Comics
 Four Color Series 1 (1939 series) #1 - Dell Publishing
 First comic-book appearance of Dick Tracy, who was already a popular feature in newspaper comics since 1931. 
 More Fun Comics #47 - National Periodical Publications
 Movie Comics #6, last issue - National Periodical Publications
 Mutt and Jeff (1939 series) #1 - National Periodical Publications
 Mystery Men Comics #2 - Fox Feature Syndicate
 Smash Comics #2 - Quality Comics
 Superman #2, cover dated Fall - National Periodical Publications

October
 October 15: Dorothy Urfer and Virginia Krausmann's Annibelle ends its run after a decade of publication. 
 October: Russell Keaton's Flyin' Jenny makes its debut. It will run until 1946. 
 Ace Comics #31 - David McKay Publications
 Action Comics #17 - National Allied Publications
 Adventure Comics #43 - National Allied Publications
 All-American Comics #7 - All-American Publications
 Amazing Man Comics #6 - Centaur Publications
 Amazing Mystery Funnies #14 - Centaur Publications
 Detective Comics #32 - National Allied Publications
 Feature Comics #25 - Quality Comics
 Four Color Series 1 #2 - Dell Publishing
 Marvel Comics (becomes Marvel Mystery Comics) (1939 series) #1 - Timely Comics
 More Fun Comics #48 - National Periodical Publications
 Mystery Men Comics #3 - Fox Feature Syndicate
 Smash Comics #3 - Quality Comics

November
 Ace Comics #32 - David McKay Publications
 Action Comics #18 - National Allied Publications
 Adventure Comics #44 - National Allied Publications
 All-American Comics #8 - All-American Publications
 Amazing Man Comics #7 - Centaur Publications
 Amazing Mystery Funnies #15 - Centaur Publications
 Blue Beetle #1 - Fox Feature Syndicate
 Detective Comics #33 - National Allied Publications
 Double Action Comics #1 — National Allied Publications. Released only in New York City newsstands, Double Action Comics was most likely an "ashcan", a limited-run publication produced simply to register the title. It had a black-and-white cover, with the contents pulled from Action Comics #2.
 Feature Comics #26 - Quality Comics
 More Fun Comics #49 - National Periodical Publications
 Mystery Men Comics #4 - Fox Feature Syndicate
 Smash Comics #4 - Quality Comics
 Superman #3 - National Allied Publications - Winter Issue

December
 Ace Comics #33 - David McKay Publications
 Action Comics #19 - National Allied Publications
 Adventure Comics #45 - National Allied Publications
 All-American Comics #9 - All-American Publications
 Amazing Man Comics #8 - Centaur Publications
 Amazing Mystery Funnies #16 - Centaur Publications
 Detective Comics #34 - National Allied Publications
 Double Action Comics (1939 series) #1 - National Periodical Publications (ashcan copy, distributed only in New York City newsstands)
 Feature Comics #27 - Quality Comics - In this issue Will Eisner and Lou Fine's Doll Man makes his debut. 
 Marvel Mystery Comics (previously Marvel Comics) #2 - Timely Comics
 More Fun Comics #50 - National Periodical Publications
 Mystery Men Comics #5 - Fox Feature Syndicate
 Smash Comics #5 - Quality Comics
 Will Eisner leaves the comics studio Eisner & Iger.

Specials
 New York World's Fair (1939 series) #1 - National Periodical Publications
 Mutt & Jeff (1939 series) #1 - All-American Comics

Specific date unknown
 The first episode of Arthur Warden's Tuffy and his Magic Tail is published.
 Lev Gleason founds the comic book company Lev Gleason Publications.
 A boom year for the burgeoning American comic book industry, as Archie Comics, Fawcett Comics, Fox Feature Syndicate, Lev Gleason Publications, Marvel Comics/Timely Comics, Nedor Comics, and Quality Comics all begin publishing.
 The Serbian comic strip Zigomar by writer Branko Vidić and artist Nikola Navojev begins publication.

Births

March
 March 27: Jo Teodorescu, Romanian illustrator and comics artist (Aventurile profesului Parbriz), (d. 2014).

April
 April 10: Shinji Mizushima, Japanese manga artist (Yakyū-kyō no Uta, Dokaben, Abu-san), (d. 2022).

Deaths

January
 January 18: Carl E. Schultze, American comics artist (Foxy Grandpa), passes away at age 72.
 January 20: Victor Bergdahl, Swedish animator and comics artist  (Kapten Grogg), dies at age 60.

June
 June 28: Joz De Swerts, Belgian illustrator, political cartoonist and comics artist (worked for Zonneland), dies at age 49.

July
 July 4: Louis Wain, British painter and illustrator (illustrations starring anthropomorphic cats), dies at age 78.
 July 25: A.E. Hayward, American comics artist (Somebody's Stenog), passes away at age 55.

August
 August 14: T.E. Powers, American comics artist (Our Moving Pictures, Mr. Nobody Holme), dies at the age of 69.

September
 September 8: Elie Smalhout, Dutch graphic artist, illustrator and comics artist (made text comics for De Notenkraker), dies at age 49.
 September 29: Luc Lafnet, aka Davine, Visnet, O. Lucas, Pol, Luc, Belgian-French comics artist (Bizouk et Pélik, Zizette, assisted on Spirou et Fantasio, Bibor et Tribar), dies at age 40 from pancreatic cancer.

October
 October 10: Benjamin Rabier, French comics artist, illustrator, animator and advertising artist (Gédéon, Tintin-Lutin, designed La Vache Qui Rit), passes away at age 74.
 October 12: Llorenç Brunet i Forroll, Spanish caricaturist, painter and comics artist, dies at age 67.
 October 18: Carl Olof Petersen, Swedish illustrator, painter and comics artist, dies at age 59.

November
 November 22: Walter Hoban, American comics artist (Jerry on the Job), passes away at age 49.

December
 December 18: Bruno Liljefors, Swedish painter and comics artist, dies at age 79.

Specific date unknown
 Paul Augros, French illustrator and comics artist, dies at age 58. 
 Louis de Lajarrige, French illustrator, painter, comics artist and writer, dies at age 66. 
 E. Nicolson, French illustrator and comics artist (Les Aventures du Chien Brownie, Bambochard et Trémolo), passes away at an unknown age.

First issues by title
All-American Comics cover dated April, published by All-American Publications
Amazing Man Comics cover dated September, published by Centaur Publications. Issues #1 through 4 were not published.
Double Action Comics cover dated December, published by National Periodical Publications. The first issue was an ashcan copy, published but not distributed or sold.
Fantastic Comics, cover-dated December, published by Fox Feature Syndicate
Four Color Series 1 published by Dell Publishing
Marvel Comics cover dated October, published by Timely Comics
Movie Comics cover dated April, published by National Periodical Publications
Mutt & Jeff cover dated Summer, published by All-American Comics
Mystery Men Comics cover dated August, published by Fox Feature Syndicate
New York World's Fair published by National Periodical Publications
Silver Streak Comics cover dated December, published by Rhoda Publications
Smash Comics cover dated August, published by Quality Comics
Superman cover dated Summer, published by National Periodical Publications
The Magic Comic cover dated July, published by D. C. Thomson & Co.

Renamed titles
Feature Comics renamed Feature Funnies as of the June cover date.
Marvel Comics renamed Marvel Mystery Comics as of the December cover date.

Initial appearances by character name
Batman (Earth-Two) in Detective Comics #27 (May), created by Bill Finger and Bob Kane, published by National Allied Publications
Bozo the Iron Man in Smash Comics #1 (August), created by George Brenner, published by Quality Comics.
Commissioner Gordon in Detective Comics #27 (May) created by Bill Finger and Bob Kane, published by National Allied Publications
Dan Garret (Blue Beetle) in Mystery Men Comics #1 (August), created by Charles Nicholas, published by Fox Feature Syndicate.
Doctor Death (comics) in Detective Comics #29 (July), created by Bob Kane, published by National Periodical Publications
Doll Girl in Feature Comics #27 (December), created by Will Eisner, Published by Quality Comics.
Doll Man in Feature Comics #27 (December), created by Will Eisner, Published by Quality Comics.
Human Torch in Marvel Comics #1 (October) created by Carl Burgos, published by Timely Comics
Invisible Hood in Smash Comics #1 (August), created by Art Pinajian, published by Quality Comics.
Joe Chill in Detective Comics #33 (November), created by Bill Finger and Bob Kane.
Monk (comics) in Detective Comics #31 (September), created by Gardner Fox and Bob Kane, published by National Periodical Publications
Namor The Sub-Mariner in Marvel Comics #1 (October) created by Bill Everett, published by Timely Comics
Sandman (Wesley Dodds) in New York World's Fair Comics #1, created by Gardner Fox and Bert Christman, published by National Periodical Publications.
Ultra-Humanite in Action Comics #13 (June), created by Jerry Siegel and Joe Shuster, published by National Periodical Publications.
Ultra-Man in All-American Comics #8 (November), created by Jon L. Blummer, published by National Periodical Publications

References